Haar Jeet is a 1940 Bollywood film directed by Amar Mullick. It stars Kanan Devi.

Cast
 Kanan Devi as Kamala
 Pahadi Sanyal as Maheshbabu Narendra
 Meera Dutta as Chhaya Devi 		
 Nawab
 Nemo
 Pannalal Shrivastava
 Madho Shukla
 Arvind

References

External links
 

1940 films
1940s Hindi-language films
Indian black-and-white films